Miraclathurella eucharis is an extinct species of sea snail, a marine gastropod mollusk in the family Pseudomelatomidae, the turrids and allies.

Description

Distribution
Fossils of this species were found in Miocene strata in Panama; age range: 11.608 to 7.246 Ma.

References

 Woodring, Wendell Phillips. Geology and paleontology of Canal Zone and adjoining parts of Panama; description of Tertiary mollusks (Gastropods: Eulimidae, Marginellidae to Helminthoglyptidae). No. 306-D. 1970.
 B. Landau and C. Marques da Silva. 2010. Early Pliocene gastropods of Cubagua, Venezuela: Taxonomy, palaeobiogeography and ecostratigraphy. Palaeontos 19:1-221

External links
 Fossilworks: Miraclathurella eucharis

eucharis
Gastropods described in 1928